Oedemera is a genus of beetles of the family Oedemeridae, subfamily Oedemerinae.

Description
Species in the genus Oedemera include slender, soft-bodied beetles of medium size, between 5 and 20 mm of length. Their colours may be bright and metallic (green, golden, copper), black and yellow and brown and black. The jaws are bifid at the apex, the last segment of maxillary palps is narrow and elongated, the antennae are long and threadlike. The elytra of most species are narrowed behind exposing part of the hind wings. The pronotum lacks lateral edges and is much narrower than elytra. The tibiae have two apical spines, in most species the hind femora of males are strongly dilated.

Biology and ecology
The species of the genus Oedemera feed on pollen and nectar and their body is covered with abundant pubescence on which pollen grains remain attached, thus contributing to pollination of the plants they frequent.
 
The species of the subgenus Oncomera fly at dusk and at night, visiting the flowers and inflorescences of aromatic shrubs and various plants (Clematis, Crataegus, Tilia, Quercus, etc.).

By contrast, the species of the subgenus Stenaxis and Oedemera s. str. are diurnal, flying in full sun in the middle of the day and visiting flowers of different families such as Asteraceae, Cistaceae, Apiaceae, etc..

Distribution
This genus includes about eighty species, distributed from the Iberian Peninsula and North Africa to Kamchatka, Kuriles, Japan and Taiwan, with some species in North Eastern Region.

List of species

Subgenus Oedemera s. str.
 O. (O.) afghana
 O. (O.) algerica
 O. (O.) annulata
 O. (O.) atrata
 O. (O.) barbara
 O. (O.) basalis
 O. (O.) basipes
 O. (O.) brevipennis
 O. (O.) crassipes
 O. (O.) cretica
 O. (O.) croceicollis
 O. (O.) femorata
 O. (O.) flavipennis
 O. (O.) flavipes
 O. (O.) graeca
 O. (O.) hispanica
 O. (O.) inapicalis
 O. (O.) lateralis
 O. (O.) lurida
 O. (O.) melanopyga
 O. (O.) monticola
 O. (O.) nobilis
 O. (O.) penicillata
 O. (O.) podagrariae
 O. (O.) pthysica
 O. (O.) rostralis
 O. (O.) rufofemorata
 O. (O.) schrammi
 O. (O.) simplex
 O. (O.) subrobusta
 O. (O.) testaceithorax
 O. (O.) tristis
 O. (O.) unicolor
 O. (O.) virescens

Subgenus Stenaxis
 O. (S.) amurensis
 O. (S.) annulata

Subgenus Oncomera

 O. (O.) femoralis
 O. (O.) flavicans
 O. (O.) marmorata
 O. (O.) murinipennis
 O. (O.) natolica
 O. (O.) reitteri

Gallery

References

External links

 Biolib
 Fauna Europaea

Oedemeridae
Tenebrionoidea genera
Taxa named by Guillaume-Antoine Olivier